Richard Johnson Putnam (September 27, 1913 – December 16, 2002) was a United States district judge of the United States District Court for the Western District of Louisiana.

Education and career

Born in Abbeville, Louisiana, Putnam received a Bachelor of Science degree from Spring Hill College in 1934 and a Bachelor of Laws from Loyola University New Orleans College of Law in 1937. He was in private practice in Abbeville from 1937 to 1954. He was a United States Naval Reserve Lieutenant during World War II, from 1942 to 1945. He was district attorney of the Fifteenth Judicial Circuit of Louisiana from 1948 to 1954. He was a judge of the Fifteenth Judicial District of Louisiana from 1954 to 1961. He was a judge of the Louisiana Court of Appeal for the First Circuit from 1960 to 1961.

Federal judicial service

Putnam was nominated by President John F. Kennedy on September 5, 1961, to the United States District Court for the Western District of Louisiana, to a new seat created by 75 Stat. 80. He was confirmed by the United States Senate on September 14, 1961, and received his commission on September 18, 1961. He assumed senior status due to a certified disability on December 19, 1975. Putnam served in that capacity until his death on December 16, 2002, in Abbeville.

References

Sources
 

1913 births
2002 deaths
Judges of the United States District Court for the Western District of Louisiana
United States district court judges appointed by John F. Kennedy
20th-century American judges
United States Navy officers